Eupithecia vojnitsi is a moth in the family Geometridae. It is found in Nepal.

References

Moths described in 2000
vojnitsi
Moths of Asia